{{Automatic taxobox
| taxon = Roseomitra
| image = Roseomitra millepunctata (MNHN-IM-2000-28182).jpeg
| image_caption = Shell of Roseomitra millepunctata (paratype at MNHN, Paris)
| authority = Fedosov, Herrmann, Kantor & Bouchet, 2018
| synonyms_ref = 
| synonyms=
| type_species= Mitra millepunctataG. B. Sowerby III, 1889 
| subdivision_ranks = Species
| subdivision = See text
| display_parents = 3
}}Roseomitra is a genus of sea snails, marine gastropod mollusks in the subfamily Mitrinae of the family Mitridae.

Species
Species within the genus Roseomitra include:

 Roseomitra citharoidea  (Dohrn, 1862)
 Roseomitra earlei (Cernohorsky, 1977)
 Roseomitra fluctuosa (Herrmann & R. Salisbury, 2013)
 Roseomitra honkeri (Poppe, Tagaro & R. Salisbury, 2009)
 Roseomitra incarnata (Reeve, 1845)
 Roseomitra millepunctata (G. B. Sowerby III, 1889)
 Roseomitra reticulata (A. Adams, 1853)
 Roseomitra rosacea (Reeve, 1845)
 Roseomitra roseovitta (S.-I Huang, 2011)
 Roseomitra strangei (Angas, 1867)
 Roseomitra tagaroae'' (Poppe, 2008)

References

External links
 Fedosov A., Puillandre N., Herrmann M., Kantor Yu., Oliverio M., Dgebuadze P., Modica M.V. & Bouchet P. (2018). The collapse of Mitra: molecular systematics and morphology of the Mitridae (Gastropoda: Neogastropoda). Zoological Journal of the Linnean Society. 183(2): 253-337

 
Mitridae
Gastropod genera